An Interpol notice is an international alert circulated by Interpol to communicate information about crimes, criminals, and threats by police in a member state (or an authorised international entity) to their counterparts around the world. The information disseminated via notices concerns individuals wanted for serious crimes, missing persons, unidentified bodies, possible threats, prison escapes, and criminals' modus operandi.

There are eight types of notices, seven of which are colour-coded by their function: red, blue, green, yellow, black, orange, and purple. The best-known notice is the red notice which is the "closest instrument to an international arrest warrant in use today". An eighth special notice is issued at the request of the United Nations Security Council.

Notices published by Interpol are made either on the organisation's own initiative or are based on requests from national central bureaus (NCBs) of member states or authorised international entities such as the United Nations and the International Criminal Court. All notices are published on Interpol's secure website. Extracts of notices may also be published on Interpol's public website if the requesting entity agrees.

Interpol may only publish a notice that adheres to all the proper legal conditions. For example, a notice will not be published if it violates Interpol's constitution, which forbids the organisation from undertaking activities of a political, military, religious, or racial character. Interpol may refuse to publish a notice that it considers inadvisable or a potential risk.

Notices may be issued in any of the four official languages of Interpol: English, French, Spanish, and Arabic.

Notice types

Similar to the notice is another request for cooperation or alert mechanism known as a "diffusion". This is less formal than a notice, but also is used to request the arrest or location of an individual or additional information in relation to a police investigation. A diffusion is circulated directly by a member state or international entity to the countries of their choice, or to the entire Interpol membership and is simultaneously recorded in Interpol's databases.

History

The International notice system was created in 1946 as Interpol re-established itself after World War II in the Parisian suburb of Saint-Cloud. It initially consisted of six colour-coded notices; Red, Blue, Green, Yellow, Black, and Purple. In 2004, the seventh colour was added, Orange.

In 2005, the Interpol-United Nations Security Council special notice was created at the request of the UN Security Council through Resolution 1617 to provide better tools to help the Security Council carry out its mandate regarding the freezing of assets, travel bans, and arms embargoes aimed at individuals and entities associated with Al-Qaeda and the Taliban and was adopted by Interpol at its 74th General Assembly in Berlin in September 2005.

Controversy

Red notice controversies

In his book Red Notice: A True Story of High Finance, Murder, and One Man's Fight for Justice, Bill Browder, the CEO of Hermitage Capital Management, describes how the Russian government repeatedly requested that Interpol issue a red notice for his arrest. Interpol refused to do so on the basis that it deemed the request was "predominantly political in nature and therefore contrary to INTERPOL's rules and regulations". Unable to secure his extradition, Browder was subsequently tried and convicted by a Moscow court for tax evasion in absentia.

In January 2017, United Kingdom-based NGO Fair Trials called on Interpol to introduce more rigorous checks. Fair Trial chief executive Jago Russell stated, "Interpol has been allowing itself to be used by oppressive regimes across the world to export the persecution of human rights defenders, journalists and political opponents". There have been concerns about conflict of interest as well as in March 2017, the UAE donated $54 million to Interpol, which roughly equalled the contributions by all other member states. Interpol's secretary-general, Jurgen Stock, stated that Interpol had introduced a task force to review requests "even more intensively".

In June 2020, Iran issued an arrest warrant for U.S. President Donald Trump and 35 other U.S. political and military officials for their role in the assassination of Qasem Soleimani and asked Interpol to issue a red notice.

It was shown in 2013 that Interpol red notices were sometimes inaccurate and could be politically motivated. NGOs such as Fair Trials International have pointed to its limited internal controls to tackle political abuses. Many of its members have poor human rights records and corrupt, undemocratic governments and have been accused of abusing the red notice networks for political purposes.

Some red notices are controversial and have been used to persecute opponents of regimes, for example the former president of Ukraine, Viktor Yanukovych, whose red notice was removed because it was shown to be a political request.

Interpol issued a new refugee policy in 2015, stipulating that a red notice should not be issued against a refugee when it has been requested by the country from which the refugee initially fled.

In November 2018, Bahrain issued a red notice for footballer and dissident Hakeem al-Araibi, who had fled Bahrain in 2014 and been granted refugee status in Australia some years later. He was arrested on arrival in Thailand with his wife for a honeymoon in November 2018 by Thai police on the basis of the red notice, despite the red notice being withdrawn a few days later on the basis of illegality. On 11 February, he was released after Thai prosecutors dropped the case, arriving in Australia the following day. He was granted Australian citizenship one month later, on 12 March 2019.

There has been growing concern about refugees being targeted by red notices illegally. Recent examples before al-Araibi's case include the detention of Russian activist Petr Silaev in Spain and Algerian human rights lawyer Rachid Mesli in Italy. In al-Araibi's case, despite the red notice being withdrawn only a few days after being issued, Bahrain nonetheless issued an extradition order, and Thailand complied, leading to a trial in which al-Araibi had to defend his opposition to the extradition.

China has used red notices to repatriate Uyghurs around the world although one of them has been cancelled upon review.

Commission for the Control of Interpol's Files

The Commission for the Control of Interpol's Files (CCF) is an independent monitoring body. It operates in line with a number of official rules and documents and has three main functions:
 Monitoring the application of data protection rules to personal data processed by Interpol
 Advising with regard to any operations or projects concerning the processing of personal information
 Processing requests for access to Interpol's files

In 2008, the Interpol General Assembly voted to amend Interpol's constitution to integrate the CCF into its internal legal structure, thereby guaranteeing its independence.

The CCF's most notable function, however, is to consider legal petitions submitted by individuals requesting the revocation of red notices. Such petitions, as a rule, only succeed when a red notice is deemed to infringe Interpol's Constitution either because it offends the Universal Declaration of Human Rights or because it was issued for political, religious, military, or racial reasons. In an interview given to Forbes Africa Magazine in July 2013, leading international defense attorney Nick Kaufman observed that it may take months for the CCF to rule on such a petition adding that the review body "doesn't have to give reasons for its decision and there is no right of appeal".

In popular culture

 In the original 1985 version of the Broderbund video game Where in the World Is Carmen Sandiego?, the first part of the player's objective in each mission is to obtain an Interpol red notice (imprecisely described as a "warrant to arrest") against a member of a fictional crime syndicate.
 Black Notice, a crime novel by Patricia Cornwell, was named after the Interpol procedure.
 The films Red Notice and SAS: Red Notice were named after the Interpol procedure.

References

External links
 of Interpol notices
Wanted persons
Missing persons

International criminal law
Interpol
Legal documents
Terrorism laws
Human rights